Palmer Plaza is a 269-foot 18-story office skyscraper in Nashville, Tennessee. It is named after the company who built it and is headquartered there, Alex S. Palmer & Company. The building features a fitness center on its rooftop.

The ninth floor of the building is home to the Consulate-General of Japan, Nashville.

See also

List of tallest buildings in Nashville

References

External links

Emporis Listing

Skyscraper office buildings in Nashville, Tennessee
Office buildings completed in 1986